Ben Conde is an American professional yo-yo player and enthusiast.  He is currently ranked number 1 in North America in the off-string division.

Ben has been playing with yo-yos since he was 4 years old.  By profession, he is a graphic designer and he lives in Los Angeles.  Of the five types of yo-yo playing, he is particularly interested in off-string yoyoing.

References

Yo-yo performers
Living people
Year of birth missing (living people)